PID or Pid may refer to:

Medicine
 Pelvic inflammatory disease or pelvic inflammatory disorder, an infection of the upper part of the female reproductive system
 Primary immune deficiency, disorders in which part of the body's immune system is missing or does not function properly
 Prolapsed intervertebral disc, commonly called a herniated disc

Science, technology and engineering
 BBC Programme Identifier, a unique identifier for a BBC television or radio programme brand, a season or series, or an individual episode
 OBD-II PIDs (on-board diagnostics parameter IDs), requests for data through an OBD connector in automotive repair
 Packet Identifier, a field in a MPEG transport stream packet

 Passive infrared detector, a passive infrared sensor
 Persistent identifier, a long-lasting reference to a document, file, web page, or other object
 Phosphotyrosine-interacting domain, also known as phosphotyrosine-binding domain, a protein domain which bind to phosphotyrosine
 Photoionization detector, measures volatile organic compounds and other gases
 Physical Interface Device, a class of a USB device
 PID controller (proportional-integral-derivative controller), a control concept used in automation
 Piping and instrumentation diagram (P&ID), a diagram in the process industry which shows the piping of the process flow etc.
 Principal ideal domain, an algebraic structure
 Process identifier, a number used by many operating systems to identify a process

Organisations
 Police Intelligence Department, a staff department of the Singapore Police Force
 Political Intelligence Department (disambiguation), multiple organisations
 Politieke Inlichtingen Dienst (Political Intelligence Department), was the main security agency for the Dutch East Indies
 Prague Integrated Transport (Pražská integrovaná doprava – PID in Czech), an integrated public transport system in Prague

Other uses
 Pathways into Darkness, a 1993 video game by Bungie
 "Paul is dead", a 1960s urban legend that Paul McCartney was dead
 Pid (video game), a 2012 video game by Might and Delight
 Project Initiation Documentation, in project management
 Party identification, the political party with which an individual identifies
 Everett Pid Purdy (1904–1951), American athlete who played in both Major League Baseball and the National Football League

See also
 PIDS (disambiguation)